Kamianets-Podilsky Ivan Ohienko National University is a university in Kamyanets-Podilsky (Ukraine).

History 

The university was founded as Kamianets-Podilsky State Ukrainian University on October 22, 1918, under a law signed by Pavlo Skoropadsky during his brief rule as Hetman of Ukraine. The first rector of the university was the scientist and linguist Ivan Ohienko. The university consisted of five faculties: History and Philology; Physics and Mathematics; Law; Theology; and  Agriculture.

The defeat of the Ukrainian national liberation movement in the autumn of 1920 by the bolsheviks determined the fate of the university: at first, it was reorganized into the Academy of Theoretical Knowledge, but on February 2, 1921 — into the Institute for Theoretical Sciences, which included three autonomous institutions: Physics and Mathematics, the Humanities and Agricultural Sciences. On February 26, 1921 the Institute for Theoretical Sciences was reorganized into two separate schools — the Institute of Public Education and Agricultural Institute. During the 1930s and 1940s the Institute of Public Education was reorganized three times — in 1930, when it was reorganized into the Institute of Social Education; in 1933–1934, into Pedagogical Institute; and in 1939, into the Institute of Teachers. Since the 1948–1949 academic year, according to the decision of the Council of Ministers of the USSR, the Kamianets-Podilsky Institute of Teachers was reorganized into the Pedagogical Institute.

It was made a State Pedagogical university in 1997, a State university in 2003 and a national university named after Ivan Ohienko in 2008.

University activity 

During its existence the university has trained about 55,000 professionals for education and other sectors of the national economy, more than 350 PhDs and Candidates of Science.

In sport, from 2007 to 2011 the students of the university have won 509 awards at the championships and universiades of Ukraine and 135 medals at the Olympic Games, World and European Championships.

The university has received a number of awards.

Gallery

References 

 
1918 establishments in Ukraine
Universities and colleges in Khmelnytskyi Oblast
Buildings and structures in Kamianets-Podilskyi
National universities in Ukraine